Mark Jay Shlomchik is an American immunologist currently UPMC Endowed Professor and chair at University of Pittsburgh.

References

Year of birth missing (living people)
Living people
University of Pittsburgh faculty
American immunologists